Clément Lebe (born January 9, 1979) is a Cameroonian football player who is currently playing for Yanbian FC.

Lebe began his career with Racing FC Bafoussam in 1998.he was part of  Cameroon U-20 national team in 1999 FIFA World Youth Championship.

In 2002, Lebe was signed by Liaoning F.C. for a fee of 100,000 yuan. He was loaned to the second-tier club Liaoning Xingguang for one season and returned to Liaoning in 2003.

In 2008, he moved to Yanbian FC and was released in the end of season 2008.

On 2 March 2010, Yanbian FC resigned Lebe for one year.

References

1979 births
Living people
Cameroonian footballers
Cameroonian expatriate footballers
Expatriate footballers in China
Chinese Super League players
China League One players
Liaoning F.C. players
Yanbian Funde F.C. players
Cameroonian expatriate sportspeople in China
Cameroon under-20 international footballers
Association football defenders